Sister Stanislaus Kennedy is an Irish nun, social activist, and former member of the Irish Council of State.

She was born Treasa Kennedy in 1939 or 1940 near Lispole on the Dingle Peninsula in County Kerry, Ireland. In 1958 she joined the Religious Sisters of Charity. Initially based in Kilkenny, Ireland she would in time move to Dublin where she is best known for having founded, in 1985, the charity Focus Ireland, which eventually became the largest voluntary organisation in Ireland other than the Legion of Mary. She attended University College Dublin and graduated with a Master of Social Science degree in 1980. In 2001, she also set up the Immigrant Council of Ireland (ICI) as a response to the social needs of new immigrants living in Ireland. In 1997 she was appointed to the Council of State and served until 2004.

In 2014, she was awarded the UCD Alumni Award for Social Sciences.

Kennedy is the author of six books published by Transworld Ireland, including her autobiography The Road Home, which contains a foreword written by former President of Ireland Mary McAleese.

References

External links
 Sr. Stanislaus Kennedy's website

 Sister Stan - The Road Home - My Journey written by Sister Stan, published by Transworld Ireland, 2011
 Mindful Meditations for Every Day Sister Stan, published by The Columba Press, 2016.

Year of birth uncertain
Living people
20th-century Irish nuns
Irish activists
Presidential appointees to the Council of State (Ireland)
21st-century Irish nuns
1939 births